Enes Sali (born 23 February 2006) is a professional footballer who plays as an attacking midfielder or a winger for Liga I club Farul Constanța. Born in Canada, he represents Romania at international level.

Early life
Born in Toronto, Ontario, Sali played youth football for Woodbridge Strikers until the age of 11. In 2017, he was scouted by Barcelona during an international tournament and moved to the Catalans for two seasons, before they encountered issues with FIFA and had to release him. Former Romanian international Gheorghe Hagi then persuaded Sali's father to move back to Romania with his son, in order for the youngster to join Viitorul Constanța's academy.

Club career
Sali registered his senior debut for the now-renamed Farul Constanța on 9 August 2021, aged 15, in a 1–0 Liga I victory over Sepsi OSK. On 13 September that year, he became the youngest player to score in the Liga I at 15 years, six months and 21 days, after netting the last goal in a 5–0 defeat of Academica Clinceni.

International career
On 3 November 2021, aged 15, Sali was selected by the Romania national team for the 2022 FIFA World Cup qualifiers against Iceland and Liechtenstein. Romanian newspaper Gazeta Sporturilor later reported that Canada had also approached him for a possible call up. 

Sali made his senior debut on 14 November by coming on as an 82nd minute substitute for Andrei Ivan in the latter match, and became the youngest European player to appear in a competitive game at 15 years and 264 days (Lucas Knecht holds the record for any player in any match type).

Personal life
Sali's parents met in Constanța, Romania, and are both of Turkish descent. After getting married, they relocated to Canada where his mother's family had been living for several decades. In 2019, Sali's father moved back to Romania with his son.

Career statistics

Club

International

References

External links
Enes Sali at Liga Profesionistă de Fotbal 
Farul Constanța official profile 

2006 births
Living people
Soccer players from Toronto 
Romanian footballers
Romania international footballers
Romania youth international footballers
Canadian soccer players
Romanian people of Turkish descent 
Canadian people of Romanian descent
Canadian people of Turkish descent
Association football midfielders
Association football wingers
Liga I players
FCV Farul Constanța players